The Sword is a monthly comic book limited series created by the Luna Brothers and published by American company Image Comics. The first issue was released in October 2007 and the series concluded in May 2010 with a giant-sized 24th issue.

It is a fantasy story set in modern-day about a young woman named Dara Brighton seeking revenge on a trio of siblings with unique abilities. Dara's conflict with the siblings revolves around, and is aided by, an unusual sword.

Plot
Dara Brighton is a young paraplegic college student with a happy, normal life, until three strangers knock on her family's door, demanding a particular sword, and displaying control over water, earth, and air. After the murder of her father, mother and sister, Dara is left in the burning house and crashes into the basement, where she finds the sword. Touching the sword heals her wounds and cures her paraplegia, giving her incredible powers and setting her on a search for vengeance for her family.

The story explores the history of the three immortal siblings Dara is chasing, as well as Dara's own history with her family and how she draws strength from those bonds and experiences. Also explored within the story is the broader impact incredible events can have in an otherwise normal world.

Dara finds out through a classmate that her father was an immortal warrior who used the sword to confront each of four siblings. He murdered one ages before (at the urging of the other three), and used the sword to keep the remaining siblings from dominating mankind. Dara vows to destroy them all, and discovers that the sword (while held) grants her fast healing, can restore amputated body parts (provided she matches up her dismembered limbs before skin covers any stumps), and provides enhanced speed and strength (allowing for tremendous leaps). She also learns the limitations of the sword; it can restore youth, but normal aging resumes when it no longer held, and any wounds that it heals will reopen in a few days unless one touches the sword again.

After Dara kills all three siblings, it is revealed that the classmate is the final sibling, who survived his attempted murder and vowed vengeance on the siblings who betrayed him. He commits suicide, after which Dara tosses the sword into a volcanic lava pit, causing all of her sustained wounds to unheal as she returns and dies in the remains of her home.

Collected editions
The series is collected into trade paperbacks:

Fire (collects The Sword #1-6, 152 pages, April 2008)
Water (collects The Sword #7-12, 152 pages, December 2008)
Earth (collects The Sword #13-18, 152 pages, September 2009)
Air (collects The Sword #19-24, 152 pages, July 2010)

Additionally, there is a deluxe hardcover with all 24 issues (December 2010).

Film
Lakeshore Entertainment are making the film version of The Sword with David Hayter writing the film's script.

References

External links
The Sword section of the Luna Brothers site
Luna Brothers Hone Storytelling Acumen on Sword, Comics Bulletin, December 4, 2007

2007 comics debuts
2010 comics endings